Selagis is a genus of beetles in the family Buprestidae, containing the following species:

 Selagis adamsi (Deuquet, 1959)
 Selagis atrocyanea (Carter, 1932)
 Selagis aurifera (Gory & Laporte, 1838)
 Selagis baumi (Obenberger, 1956)
 Selagis caloptera (Boisduval, 1835)
 Selagis carteri (Obenberger, 1956)
 Selagis chloriantha (Fairmaire, 1877)
 Selagis commixta (Obenberger, 1930)
 Selagis confusa (Obenberger, 1832)
 Selagis corusca (Waterhouse, 1882)
 Selagis despecta (Fairmaire, 1877)
 Selagis discoidalis (Blackburn, 1892)
 Selagis hopei (Obenberger, 1956)
 Selagis intercribrata (Fairmaire, 1877)
 Selagis obscura (Carter, 1924)
 Selagis olivacea (Carter, 1913)
 Selagis peroni (Fairmaire, 1877)
 Selagis regia (Carter, 1928)
 Selagis spencei (Mannerheim, 1837)
 Selagis splendens (Macleay, 1872)
 Selagis venusta (Carter, 1937)
 Selagis viridicyanea (Fairmaire, 1877)
 Selagis yalgoensis (Carter, 1924)
 Selagis zecki (Deuquet, 1959)

References

External links
Selagis. Atlas of Living Australia.

Buprestidae genera